Lupinus pubescens (local name: chocho del páramo) is a lupine flower which is native to the high Andes, but can also be found in China, Colombia, Ecuador, and Venezuela.

References

External links

pubescens
Flora of China
Flora of Colombia
Flora of Ecuador
Flora of Venezuela
Páramo flora